A&M Octone Records was an American record label owned as a joint venture between Universal Music Group and Octone Records. A full-service artist development label, it was founded in 2007 as a merger between Octone and Interscope Geffen A&M's defunct A&M Records label. For its six years of existence, A&M Octone operated music publishing, merchandising, and touring entities, in addition to specializing in recorded music.

In September 2013, Octone initiated its buy/sell rights in the joint venture, resulting in Interscope Geffen A&M purchasing Octone's 50% interest in A&M Octone, with Interscope absorbing and restructuring its artist roster in 2014.

Overview

History
Launched in 2000, Octone Records was founded by CEO/President James Diener and distributed through Bertelsmann Music Group (known as Sony BMG since 2004). After successful signing, release, marketing and promotion on Octone, artists were given the option of upstreaming to RCA Music Group, via a joint-venture between the two companies. Upon launch, Diener and Octone Records were also well known in the music industry for their entrepreneurial private-equity financing model.

In February 2007, Interscope-Geffen-A&M partnered with Octone Records to relaunch the A&M label, headed by James Diener and called A&M/Octone Records with worldwide distribution handled by parent Universal Music Group. The existing Octone roster was transferred to the A&M/Octone label and all new artist signings were made under the A&M/Octone joint venture.

The legal name of the A&M/Octone label was "OctoScope Music, LLC" (d.b.a. A&M/Octone Records), the name derives from the merger of the labels Octone and Interscope. OctoScope Music, LLC was the copyright holder on all A&M/Octone releases. A&M/Octone Records operated from 2007 until 2014.

Executive staff
 James Diener, CEO/president
 David Boxenbaum, general manager/chief operating officer
 Ben Berkman, EVP/head of promotion
 Rome Thomas, senior vice president sales & artist development
 Nina Webb, head of marketing
 Roi Hernandez, head of creative services & electronic A&R
 Yu-Ting Lin, vice president A&R admin & label operations

Former recording artists 
 Maroon 5
 K'Naan
 Flyleaf
 Hollywood Undead
 Kat Graham
 The Hives
 The Knocks
 Bombay Bicycle Club
 Hunter Hunted
 Drop City Yacht Club
 Kevin Hammond
 Duncan
 Churchill
 As Fast As
 Dropping Daylight
 Paper Tongues
 Michael Tolcher
 Miss Willie Brown

See also
 A&M Records
 Interscope Records
 Geffen Records
 Interscope-Geffen-A&M

References

External links
A&M/Octone Records official website
(site no longer active)
Octone Records Harvard Business School case study
June 2009 Los Angeles Times interview
January 2010 CNN/Money video profile
March 2010 NY Enterprise Report cover story
 September 2010 Wall Street Journal "Walkabout NY" Interview
 A&M/Octone Records - Harvard Business School Case Study Part II
 November 2010 Fast Company on A&M/Octone Records, K'Naan & Coca Cola
 January 2011 MIDEM Convention panel in Cannes, Frances w/James Diener discussing K'Naan/Coca Cola World Cup campaign & A&M/Octone artist development

Record labels established in 2007
Record labels disestablished in 2014
A&M Records
Interscope Records
American record labels
Alternative rock record labels
Rock record labels
Labels distributed by Universal Music Group
Companies based in New York City